A Cool Sound from Hell is a 1959 Canadian film directed by Sidney J. Furie.

Plot summary
A young man (Anthony Ray) becomes disillusioned with the beat crowd he hangs with when they become involved with drugs.

Production
Furie's second film. Shortly after making this film Furie left for England where his career took off in 1961 with The Young Ones starring Cliff Richard.

This film was the first job of the director Don Owen; Furie hired him as his assistant director.

The soundtrack was provided by jazz great Phil Nimmons.

Release
Despite having been filmed in Toronto, Canada, the film was released theatrically only in England, and never screened in North America. The film was later thought to have been lost, but was eventually located in the British Film Institute archives and finally had its North American premiere at the 2016 Toronto International Film Festival.

References

External links
 
 

1959 films
Films directed by Sidney J. Furie
1959 drama films
Canadian drama films
English-language Canadian films
Films set in Toronto
1950s English-language films
1950s Canadian films